Statistics of Ekstraklasa for the 1965–66 season.

Overview
14 teams competed in the 1965-66 season with Górnik Zabrze winning the championship.

League table

Results

Top goalscorers

References
 Poland – List of final tables at RSSSF 

Ekstraklasa seasons
1965–66 in Polish football
Pol